Misuk'ani (misuk'a common name of Adesmia miraflorensis, Aymara -ni  a suffix, "the one with the misuk'a plant", also spelled Misucani) is a  mountain in the Bolivian Andes. It is located in the Cochabamba Department, Esteban Arce Province, Anzaldo Municipality, west of the village of Matarani.

References 

Mountains of Cochabamba Department